The Otis Hotel is a historic five-story building in Spokane, Washington. It was designed by Arthur W. Cowley and Archibald G. Rigg, and built in 1911 for Dr. Joseph E. Gandy. It was first known as the Willard Hotel, and later as the Atlantic Hotel, followed by the Earle Hotel, and finally the Otis Hotel. It has been listed on the National Register of Historic Places since October 2, 1998. Since a $15 million renovation completed to convert the building back into a hotel in early 2020, the building has been reopened as the Hotel Indigo Spokane and is part of the InterContinental Hotels Group.

References

Hotel buildings on the National Register of Historic Places in Washington (state)
National Register of Historic Places in Spokane County, Washington
Early Commercial architecture in the United States
Hotel buildings completed in 1911